Empel en Meerwijk  is a former municipality of the Dutch province of North Brabant and consisted of Dieskant, Empel, Oud-Empel, Gewande, and Meerwijk. It was situated south of the river Meuse and east of the river Dieze. Since 1971 it has made part of the municipality of 's-Hertogenbosch.

On its area there was a fort called Crèvecoeur. The remainings are still used for military exercises.

The villages of Empel en Meerwijk were a fiefdom originally belonging to Crespin Abbey in northern France.

References 
 Equivalent article on the Dutch Wikipedia.

Former municipalities of North Brabant
's-Hertogenbosch